Jennifer Paz-Fedorov (born April 23, 1974) is an American actress. She is mostly known for her recurring role as Lapis Lazuli in Steven Universe and Steven Universe Future.

Career
The youngest of four children, Paz moved with her family at the age of 5 from the Philippines to Seattle, where her mother's brother was living at the time.

After completing her freshman year at the University of Washington in Seattle, Paz - then at the age of 21 - played the alternate of the lead role of Kim in the 1st National Miss Saigon US Tour. Since this professional debut, Paz has received multi-award nominations and wins including a 2008 LA Stage Alliance Ovation Award for Best Lead Actress.

In 2013, Paz returned to playing the lead role of Kim in Miss Saigon at the Casa Mañana theatre.

Paz is known for providing the voice of Lapis Lazuli and part of the voice of Malachite on the Cartoon Network 
television series, Steven Universe.

Personal life
Paz became engaged to boyfriend Anthony Fedorov on December 25, 2012. Their son, Julian Paz Fedorov, was born on April 1, 2013.

Filmography

Recordings
The Lost Chords: Cinderella - "I Lost My Heart At the Ball", "The Face That I See in the Night"
Walt Disney Records The Legacy Collection: Cinderella - "I Lost My Heart At the Ball", "The Face That I See in the Night"
Awakening - Featured Vocals
The Lost Chords: The Rescuers - "The Need to Be Loved"
Steven Universe, Vol. 2 (Original Soundtrack) - "That Distant Shore"
Steven Universe the Movie (Original Soundtrack) - "Happily Ever After", "Who We Are", "Finale"
Steven Universe Future (Original Soundtrack) - “Shining Through”

References

External links

Living people
1974 births
21st-century Filipino actresses
Filipino film actresses
Filipino voice actresses
Filipino musical theatre actresses
Actresses from Manila
University of Washington alumni
Filipino emigrants to the United States